Maksim Moiseyev (born 8 February 1987) is a retired Belarusian professional footballer.

External links

Profile at teams.by

1987 births
Living people
Belarusian footballers
Association football goalkeepers
FC Belshina Bobruisk players
FC Vitebsk players
FC Slavia Mozyr players
FC Smorgon players